Lucky Nine (originally Luck or Design) is an Irish-bred, Hong Kong based racehorse. He was one of the nominees of 2010-2011 Hong Kong Horse of the Year.

Background
Lucky Nine is a bay gelding bred in Ireland by the Darley Stud. He was sired by Dubawi, a son of Dubai Millennium who won the Irish 2,000 Guineas and the Prix Jacques Le Marois in 2005. He was originally named Luck or Design.

Racing career
Luck or Design raced in Ireland as a two-year-old in 2009, winning a maiden race at Naas Racecourse by five lengths. Luck or Design was then sold and exported to race in Hong Kong where he was renamed Lucky Nine.

In Hong Kong, Lucky Nine has won important races including the National Day Cup in 2010, the Hong Kong Classic Mile and the Hong Kong Sprint in 2011 and the Queen's Silver Jubilee Cup in 2012. Racing in international competition he finished second in Japan's Centaur Stakes in 2011 and third in the Dubai Golden Shaheen in 2012.
Lucky Nine went to Singapore for the International Sprint (Kris Flyer) Group 1 race in May 2013, and easily accounted for an international field that included Australian horse Bel Sprinter (who managed to come second).

References
 The Hong Kong Jockey Club – Lucky Nine Racing Record
 Hong Kong Jockey Club

Racehorses trained in Hong Kong
Hong Kong racehorses
2007 racehorse births
Racehorses bred in Ireland
Thoroughbred family 6-a